The 1973 Prize of Moscow News was the eighth edition of an international figure skating competition organized in Moscow, Soviet Union. It was held December 9–14, 1973. Medals were awarded in the disciplines of men's singles, ladies' singles, pair skating and ice dancing. The Soviet Union's Vladimir Kovalev, a world medalist, won the men's title for the first time, after three previous podium finishes. West Germany national champion Gerti Schanderl took the ladies' title ahead of Soviet skater Ludmila Bakonina. Soviets swept the pairs' podium, led by Olympic champion  Alexei Ulanov and his second partner, Lyudmila Smirnova. The ice dancing title was won by Natalia Linichuk / Gennadi Karponosov, who would take the world bronze medal later in the season.

Men

Ladies

Pairs

Ice dancing

References

Prize of Moscow News
1973 in figure skating